Northern midland and mountainous, before 1954 known as the Midland and upstream is the mountain area and sell-mountain in Northern Vietnam (Vietnamese: Bắc Bộ).

In terms of administration, this region includes 15 provinces: Hà Giang, Cao Bằng, Lào Cai, Bắc Kạn, Lạng Sơn, Tuyên Quang, Yên Bái, Thái Nguyên, Phú Thọ, Bắc Giang, Quảng Ninh, Lai Châu, Điện Biên, Sơn La, Hòa Bình. The regional center is the city of Thái Nguyên.

According to the planning of industrial areas of the Vietnam Government in 2020, most of the midland and northern mountainous (except Quảng Ninh) is located in First Area.

It's divided into 2 sub-regions:

 Northwest: Điện Biên, Lai Châu, Sơn La, Hòa Bình, Lào Cai, Yên Bái.
 Northeast: Phú Thọ, Hà Giang, Tuyên Quang, Cao Bằng, Lạng Sơn, Bắc Kạn, Thái Nguyên, Bắc Giang, Quảng Ninh.

This region have the largest area of Vietnam (over 101 thousand km2), a population of more than 12 million people (2006) account about 30,5% of the area and 14.2% of the population.

Geography

Location 
Midland and northern mountainous geography is rather special, it has a network of transportation is being invested, upgraded, should increasingly facilitate exchanges with other regions in the country and build open economic.

Northern midlands and mountainous is bordered by 2 provinces of Southern China: Guangxi and Yunnan to the north; 3 provinces of Upper Laos: Phongsali, Luang Prabang, Hua Phan to the west; Red River Delta to the southeast; North Central Coast to the southwest; Gulf of Tonkin to the east.

References

External links 
 Information about this region

Regions of Vietnam
Geography of Vietnam